Legio I Isaura Sagitaria was a pseudocomitatensis Roman legion, the legion was probably created by emperor Probus. It is possible that in the beginning it, together with the II and III Isaura, it was used to defend the Isauria region, The legion campaigned against the tribes of Cilicia. As its name suggests, its legionaries could be used also as archers, an uncommon feature for Roman legions. According to Notitia Dignitatum, in the beginning of the 5th century the I Isaura was under the command of the Magister Militum per Orientem.

See also
List of Roman legions

References 

01 Isaura
Isauria
Military units and formations established in the 3rd century
Archers
Military archers